Sicula is a genus of grasshoppers in the family Morabidae. The genus has one described species, Sicula gracilior, found in Australia.

References

Morabidae
Insects described in 1976
Fauna of Australia